The 1938–39 season was the 40th season for FC Barcelona.

Events
Most of the players have been exiled in France and Mexico, the Club only disputes some other friendly party. The situation is dramatic, with the war, it seems that Barça comes to an end. This year there was no transfer . After the war, Barca is about to disappear, but a management commission takes over the Club. It was constituted according to the criterion of the Federation. It was run by Joan Soler, a former member of the Board. They were part of the same: two members of the last Directive, and two soldiers of the Spanish Traditional Falange and JONS. Also included the captain of the Civil Guard Manuel Bravo Montero, head of the so-called Anti-Marxist Rondin, a kind of police body dedicated to the repression of the "Red-separatists." In a public act admitted "to have fought and hated the Barcelona".

Results

Friendly 
29 June Barcelona - Athletic Bilbao 9-1′
2 July Barcelona - Zaragoza 0-1.
2 July Barcelona - Horta 4-2.
9 July Barcelona - Alavés 2-4.
9 July Barcelona - Poblesec 4-2.
11 July Barcelona - Espanyol 3-1.
16 July Barcelona - Recuperación de Levante 3-2.
18 July Barcelona - Europa 2-5.
18 July Barcelona - Recuperación de Catalunya 3-1.
 1. Reopening Camp de Les Corts and first game under the new regime of Franco. A Spanish team wearing the Barça faces the Athletic Bilbao. A portion of the proceeds is allocated to subsidize the Combatiente party.

External links

webdelcule.com
webdelcule.com

References

FC Barcelona seasons
Barcelona